Brickman is a surname of English origin. Notable people with the surname include:

Arlyne Brickman, American mafia informant and prostitute
Jason Brickman (born 1991), American basketball player
Jim Brickman (born 1961), American pianist and New Age composer
Lester Brickman, American law professor and legal scholar
Marc Brickman (born 1953), American lighting designer
Marshall Brickman (born 1941), Brazilian-American screenwriter and banjo player
Morrie Brickman (1917–1994), American cartoonist
Paul Brickman (born 1949), American screenwriter and film director (Risky Business)

Fictional
 Brickman (comic strip), comic strip and character created by UK cartoonist Lew Stringer

English-language surnames
Occupational surnames